Andrei Aleksandrovich Chadov (Russian: Андрей Александрович Чадов, born 22 May 1980) is a Russian actor.

Early life
Chadov was born in 1980. He has a younger brother, Aleksey, who is also an actor. His father, Aleksandr Chadov, died in 1986, leaving the brothers to be raised by their mother. Chadov began acting at school, then continued as amateur actors at the municipal theatre-studio in Peredelkino, Moscow Oblast. After graduating from school, Chadov enrolled at the Shchukin Acting School, then transferred to join his brother at Shchepkin Theatrical School in Moscow.

Career
While a student, Chadov made his film debut in a supporting role in Avalanche (2001) by director Ivan Solovov.

Andrei became famous after starring in television series The Cadets, where he played one of the main characters: the young Peter Todorovskiy.

In 2004 he starred in the drama Russians. For this role, Andrei received the prize at the festival "Moscow Premiere" in the category Best Actor.

In 2006, Chadvo appeared alongside his brother in the film Alive. They have also appeared together in various other films and television series, such as SLOVE. Soldiers of Love, and the television show A Matter of Honor.

Chadov has also been involved in Western film productions, such as the 2008 British film Bigga than Ben.

Personal life
During filming of the television show Big Race Chadov met Svetlana Svetikova, who became his girlfriend, although they broke up in the spring of 2010.

Filmography

References

External links

1980 births
Male actors from Moscow
Russian male film actors
Russian male stage actors
Russian male television actors
Living people
21st-century Russian male actors
21st-century Russian singers
21st-century Russian male singers